Saara is a genus of lizards in the subfamily Uromasticinae of the family Agamidae. The genus is endemic to Asia.

Taxonomy
Until 2009, the member species of the genus Saara were generally included in the genus Uromastyx.

Geographic range and habitat
Saara species are native to dry habitats in southwestern Asia, ranging from Iran to northwestern India.

Species

Nota bene: A binomial authority in parentheses indicates that the species was originally described in a genus other than Saara.

References

Further reading
Gray JE (1845). Catalogue of the Specimens of Lizards in the Collection of the British Museum. London: Trustees of the British Museum. (Edward Newman, printer). xxviii + 289 pp. (Saara, new genus, p. 262).

Saara (lizard)
Lizards of Asia
Lizard genera
Taxa named by John Edward Gray